Frederick "Eric" E. Batten (13 June 1914 – 3 September 1993) was an English rugby union and professional rugby league footballer who played in the 1930s, 1940s and 1950s, and coached rugby league in the 1950s. Eric Batten appeared in eight Challenge Cup Finals; two for Leeds, five for Bradford Northern, and one for Featherstone Rovers, winning three, and losing five, he scored a total of 443 tries during his career, he his third on the all-time try scorers list behind Brian Bevan (796 tries), and Billy Boston (571 tries),

Background

Eric Batten's birth was  registered in Sculcoates district, Kingston upon Hull, East Riding of Yorkshire, England, he was a dustman in the cleansing department for Hemsworth Rural District council, he died aged 79 in Leeds, West Yorkshire, England, and he is buried in Lawnswood Cemetery, Leeds.

Playing career

Club career
Eric Batten started his rugby career playing rugby union at Sandal RUFC before signing for the rugby league club Wakefield Trinity in September 1933. He made his début for Wakefield Trinity in the 9–3 victory over Bradford Northern at Odsal Stadium, Bradford on Saturday 30 September 1933. He played 41 matches for Wakefield Trinity, scoring 12 tries in those matches, including a hat-trick against Hull Kingston Rovers in March 1936, before he moved to Hunslet in September 1936 for £400. During the war years, Eric returned to Wakefield Trinity as a World War II guest, playing two matches in May 1940, and one February 1943, in these three wartime matches he scored eight tries, including four against Huddersfield in May 1940, making his club total 20 tries in 44 appearances. he also played one match for Castleford as a World War II guest, he played , i.e. number 2, against Dewsbury at Crown Flatt, Dewsbury on Saturday 14 February 1942.

International honours
Eric Batten won caps for England while at Hunslet in 1938 against Wales, in 1939 against France, and Wales, in 1940 against Wales, in 1941 against Wales, in 1943 against Wales, while at Bradford Northern in 1944 against Wales, in 1945 against Wales (2 matches), in 1946 against France (2 matches), and Wales, in 1947 against France, in 1948 against France, and won caps for Great Britain while at Bradford Northern in 1946 against Australia (2 matches), New Zealand, and in 1947 against New Zealand.

Championship final appearances
Eric Batten played right-, i.e. number 3, in Hunslet's 8–2 victory over Leeds in the Championship Final during the 1937–38 at Elland Road, Leeds on Saturday 30 April 1938. and played in Bradford Northern's 26-20 aggregate victory over Halifax in the Championship Final during the 1944–45 season; the 2–9 defeat at Thrum Hall, Halifax, and the 24–11 victory at Odsal Stadium, Bradford.

Challenge Cup Final appearances
Eric Batten played in Leeds' 19–2 victory over Halifax in the 1940–41 Challenge Cup Final during the 1940–41 season at Odsal Stadium, Bradford, in front of a crowd of 28,500, played in the 15-16 aggregate defeat by Dewsbury in the 1942–43 Challenge Cup Final during the 1942–43 season; the 9–16 defeat at Crown Flatt, Dewsbury on Sunday 9 May 1943, in front of a crowd of 10,470, and the 6–0 victory at Headingley, Leeds on Sunday 16 May 1943, in front of a crowd of 16,000, played in Bradford Northern's 8-3 aggregate victory over Wigan in the 1943–44 Challenge Cup Final during the 1943–44 season; the 0–3 defeat at Central Park, Wigan on Saturday 15 April 1944, and the 8–0 victory at Odsal Stadium, Bradford on Saturday 22 April 1944, played in the 9-13 aggregate defeat by Huddersfield in the 1944–45 Challenge Cup Final during the 1944–45 season; the 4–7 defeat at Fartown, Huddersfield, and the 5–6 defeat at Odsal Stadium, Bradford, played in the 8–4 victory over Leeds in the 1946–47 Challenge Cup Final during the 1946–47 season at Wembley Stadium, London on Saturday 3 May 1947, played , i.e. number 2, in the 3–8 defeat by Wigan in the 1947–48 Challenge Cup Final during the 1947–48 season at Wembley Stadium, London on Saturday 1 May 1948, in front of a crowd of 91,465, and played  in Featherstone Rovers' 10–18 defeat by Workington Town in the 1951–52 Challenge Cup Final during the 1951–52 season at Wembley Stadium, London on Saturday 19 April 1952, in front of a crowd of 72,093.

Bradford Northern played in five of the six Challenge Cup finals between 1944 and 1949, the first two finals; the 1943–44 Challenge Cup Final against Wigan, and the 1944–45 Challenge Cup Final against Huddersfield were played over two-legs, five Bradford Northern players played in all five of these finals, they were; Eric Batten, Vic Darlison, Donald Ward, Ernest Ward, and Frank Whitcombe.

Other notable matches
Eric Batten played , i.e. number 2, for a Rugby League XIII against Northern Command XIII at Thrum Hall, Halifax on Saturday 21 March 1942.

Notable tour matches
Eric Batten played , i.e. number 2, in Wakefield Trinity's 6–17 defeat by Australia in the 1933–34 Kangaroo tour of Great Britain match during the 1933–34 season at Belle Vue, Wakefield on Saturday 28 October 1933.

Club career
Eric Batten made his début for Featherstone Rovers on Saturday 2 December 1939.

Coaching career

Club career
Eric Batten was the coach of Batley from October 1956 to April 1958.

Honoured at Featherstone Rovers
Eric Batten is a Featherstone Rovers Hall of Fame inductee.

Genealogical information
Eric Batten was the son of the rugby league footballer Billy Batten. Eric Batten's marriage to Annie (née Saxton, born  in Wakefield district – died aged 81 on 13 April 1995) was registered during first  1937 in Wakefield district. They had children; John Michael Batten (birth registered third  1940 in Hemsworth district) Janet Batten (birth registered first   in Hemsworth district), and Gaynor Batten (birth registered second   in Hemsworth district). He was buried at Lawnswood Cemetery, Leeds.

References

External links
(archived by web.archive.org) The Millennium Masters – Backs
Photograph "Team to visit Barrow in the Cup 1946 - The team to visit Barrow in the 1946 Challenge Cup waits to board the coach. - 07/03/1946" at rlhp.co.uk
Photograph "Ernest Ward holds the Cup aloft - Ernest Ward holds the Cup aloft as he walks to the dressing rooms at Wembley. - 01/01/1947" at rlhp.co.uk
Photograph "Eric Batten scores - Eric batten seen beating Ted Carroll of Hunslet to score in Northern's 14-7 win in the 1948 Challenge Cup semi at Headingley in front of 38,125. - 03/04/1948" at rlhp.co.uk
Photograph "1948 Championship Semi-final - Ces Mountford kicks as Eric Batten tries to block the ball in the 1948 Championship Semi-final. - 24/03/1948" at rlhp.co.uk
Photograph "1948 Challenge Cup Final - A world record crowd of 91,465 saw Bradford Northern lose to Wigan by 8 points to 3 in this 1948 Final at Wembley. Here King George VI is seen being introduced to the Bradford Northern side. - 01/05/1948" at rlhp.co.uk
Photograph "Four Northern Greats - Four Northern Greats re-unite at Odsal. - 19/06/1980" at rlhp.co.uk
Photograph "Northern Greats - A collection of Northern Greats return to the pitch to celebrate 50 years at Odsal Stadium. - 26/08/1984" at rlhp.co.uk
Photograph "Eric Batten leap - Eric Batten leaps over his opposite number at Headingley. - 21/05/1947" at rlhp.co.uk
Photograph "First visit to Odsal - Workington Town pay their first visit to Odsal in February 1946. Workington's Billy Iris tackles Eric Batten. - 02/02/1946" at rlhp.co.uk
Photograph "Championship winning team 1945 - Bradford Northern's Championship winning team of 1945. - 01/01/1945" at rlhp.co.uk
Photograph "Eric Batten Kicks - Eric batten kicks the ball forward after a scrum. - 01/01/2000" at rlhp.co.uk (actual date 22 April 1944)
Photograph "Challenge cup winning side. - The Bradford Northern Challenge Cup winning side of 1944. Northern beat Wigan 8-0 after losing 3-0 away from home in the first leg. - 22/04/1944" at rlhp.co.uk
Photograph "Eric Batten Kicks - Eric batten kicks the ball forward after a scrum. - 01/01/1939" at rlhp.co.uk (actual date 22 April 1944)
Photograph "Northern at Fartown - The Northern side that took on Huddersfield in 1948. Bradford won 7-2 at Fartown. - 30/03/1948" at rlhp.co.uk

1914 births
1993 deaths
Batley Bulldogs coaches
Bradford Bulls players
Castleford Tigers players
England national rugby league team players
English rugby league coaches
English rugby league players
Featherstone Rovers captains
Featherstone Rovers coaches
Featherstone Rovers players
Great Britain national rugby league team players
Hunslet F.C. (1883) players
Leeds Rhinos players
People from Sculcoates
Rugby league players from Kingston upon Hull
Rugby league wingers
Rugby League XIII players
Wakefield Trinity players